Jordan is an unincorporated community in Hickory County, in the U.S. state of Missouri.

History
Jordan was founded in 1904, and named after the proprietor of a local gristmill. A post office called Jordan was established in 1906, and remained in operation until 1955.

References

Unincorporated communities in Hickory County, Missouri
Unincorporated communities in Missouri